Brendan Hunt is an American actor and writer known for roles in the films We're the Millers (2013) and Horrible Bosses 2 (2014) as well as voicing two characters in the video game Fallout 4 (2015). He is a co-creator of the Apple TV+ sitcom Ted Lasso, as well as a writer and regular cast member (Coach Beard).

Early life and education
In 1996, Hunt completed the theater program at Illinois State University. While there, he performed at the Illinois Shakespeare Festival and completed a week-long master class under the guidance of actress Judith Ivey.

Career
After getting his theater degree, Hunt studied with The Second City in Chicago before heading to Amsterdam and joining the Boom Chicago comedy troupe.

Boom Chicago 
From 1998 to 2008, Hunt was a regular writer and performer with the Boom Chicago comedy and improvisational troupe. Hunt was the head writer and featured in the Comedy Central (Netherlands) satirical news program Comedy Central News (CCN) that was produced by Boom Chicago. While with the group, Hunt performed alongside Jason Sudeikis (Horrible Bosses, We're the Millers, Saturday Night Live), Jordan Peele (Key and Peele) and Seth Meyers (Late Night with Seth Meyers, Saturday Night Live). 

While Boom Chicago was based in Amsterdam, they embarked on a "comedy exchange" with The Second City performing at their Chicago, Illinois theater in 2003. The Chicago Tribune noted Hunt's performance as soccer star Roy Keane, calling it the "best character of the night."

While with Boom, Hunt co-wrote and co-starred in a pair of two-man shows at Edinburgh Festival Fringe: Iconic Yanks with Meyers and Here Comes the Neighborhood with Peele.

Five Years in Amsterdam 
After returning to the United States, Hunt developed a one-man show based on his time in the Netherlands called Five Years in Amsterdam.

In the performance, Hunt takes a comedic and touching look back at five years living in Europe as an American. Among topics examined are relationships, drug excesses, experiences at a fetish club and his feelings about the Match of the Day anthem and Alan Hansen. He also recounts a rough childhood with "an absent father" and an alcoholic mother.

In its review, The Stage said of the show, "each drop of comedy gold is lovingly extracted in a superbly crafted, unflinchingly honest and enormously enjoyable whole" and called it a "must see" at the Edinburgh Festival Fringe.

Hunt performed the play at the 2007 edition of The Comedy Festival in Aspen, Colorado. and also took the show on the road to The Second City in Chicago, Upright Citizens Brigade in New York City and iO West in Los Angeles.

Sacred Fools 

In 2007, Hunt joined the Sacred Fools Theater Company. Hunt's time at Sacred Fools included a turn as the lead in the musical Savin' Up for Saturday Night that proved to be an Ovation Awards-winning role. Hunt won Lead Actor in a Musical at the 2010 Ovation Awards.

Absolutely Filthy
In 2013, Hunt wrote and was the lead actor in a dark comedy parody of the Charlie Brown Peanuts comic strip called Absolutely Filthy. The play has won multiple awards in both Los Angeles and New York.

Hunt based his lead character, The Mess, on an older version of the character of Pig-Pen, who is now homeless and trying to cope with his recent breakup from The Bereaved, who is based on the Peanuts character Sally Brown. The setting of the play is a reunion of the old gang during the funeral of The Deceased (a version of Charlie Brown). For legal reasons, the characters were given abstract names in the program of the show, though the characters are referred to by their familiar Peanuts names on stage.

To illustrate his cloud of dust, Hunt keeps a Hula Hoop in constant motion around his body throughout the show.

Hunt came up with the idea of the play while dancing alone during the Burning Man festival with the resulting kick-up of dust in the sunrise reminding him of Pig-Pen. The play was originally created as a series of 10-minute sketches for the Sacred Fools Theater Company as part of its "Serial Killers" late-night series. Hunt was asked to turn the sketches into a single play.

The play has received overwhelmingly favorable reviews, with The New York Observer saying it creates an "endorphin high that accompanies laughing until your eyes water." The LA Weekly gave accolades for Hunt's performance, saying he "steals the show.".

Hunt and the play also won several awards. The 2013 Hollywood Fringe Festival named Absolutely Filthy as "Top of the Fringe" and Best Comedy. At the 2014 FringeNYC, the play won three awards that included an acting award for Hunt as well as prizes for overall play and TheaterMania audience favorite. Hunt was nominated in four categories in the 2014 LA Weekly Theater Awards, winning the top prize in the categories of Best Male Performance and Comedy Ensemble.

Film, TV and video game work
After roles in episodes of the television series Reno 911!, Parks and Recreation, Community and How I Met Your Mother,  Hunt made his major motion picture debut as the "Sketchy Dude" in 2013's We're the Millers, which featured his Boom Chicago castmate Jason Sudeikis.

Hunt had a role in another Sudeikis vehicle, 2014's Horrible Bosses 2, playing a sex addiction group member.

An Emmy Award nomination was among the accomplishments for Hunt as a regular performer on the Comedy Central series Key & Peele. Along with appearing in several sketches, Hunt was nominated at the 67th Primetime Emmy Awards for Outstanding Writing for a Variety Special. The nomination, with Keegan-Michael Key, Jordan Peele and Rich Talarico, was for the Key & Peele Super Bowl Special.

In 2013, Hunt co-wrote a Premier League advertising campaign for NBC Sports featuring himself as an assistant coach to Tottenham Hotspur with Jason Sudeikis. Sudeikis told GQ magazine that the two drew off their years in Amsterdam playing FIFA together before and after shows. The commercials were named as the second-best TV soccer sketch by Paste with the magazine saying, "Brilliant though Sudeikis is, the unsung hero of these sketches is Brendan Hunt." The campaign received a Bronze award at the 2014 Sports Clio Awards.

Hunt was a writer and performer in the 2015 online comedy-documentary series Thank You and Sorry for Google Play. The six-episode series featured a mix of comedy sketches and a real-life look at musician Jack Antonoff and his tours with Bleachers.

In 2015, Hunt brought his voice as one of the main DJs in the game Fallout 4. Hunt plays DJ Travis of Diamond City Radio, whose monotone voice reflects on the surroundings of the ruins of Boston now known as the Commonwealth. Hunt also plays Detective Perry, who is seen in a holotape.

Starting in 2014, Hunt also made his mark in children and teen television with roles in the Disney Channel series Dog With a Blog and Austin & Ally, as well as Disney XD’s Kirby Buckets.

Hunt co-created the series Ted Lasso and appears as a regular cast member; the series launched on Apple TV+ in 2020.

He has appeared in several commercials, including ads for GEICO, Skittles, Oscar Meyer, and Volkswagen.

Other work
At the 2016 Hollywood Fringe Festival, Hunt debuted the one-man play Still Got It. In the show, Hunt plays a person reeling from making a bad toast at his friend’s wedding. Hunt’s performance was honored for top Solo Performance at the 2016 Hollywood Fringe Festival Awards.

Filmography

Film

Television

Video games

Online

Credits

Accolades

References

External links
 
 
 
 Commercials featuring Brendan Hunt
 Brendan Hunt on Funny or Die
 Brendan Hunt Demo Reel 
 "Soccer is Your Friend" on Facebook.
 Brendan Hunt theater credits

1972 births
21st-century American male actors
American male film actors
American male television actors
American male voice actors
American sketch comedians
American television writers
American male television writers
Living people
Male actors from Chicago
Male actors from Los Angeles
American male video game actors
Comedians from California
Comedians from Illinois
Screenwriters from Illinois
Screenwriters from California
21st-century American comedians
21st-century American screenwriters
21st-century American male writers
Primetime Emmy Award winners